The Baridustae were an Illyrian tribe that lived in Dalmatia, around Bariduum, a settlement located between Salona and Servitium, more precisely 30 miles north of Salona, which has been identified with the site area of Livno, in present-day Bosnia and Herzegovina. They are attested only in epigraphic material.

The Baridustae are documented, along with other Illyrian tribes like the Pirustae and Sardiatae, in the epigraphic material of Alburnus Maior in Roman Dacia, a mining town where several Illyrian peoples moved by the time of Roman emperor Trajan. A great number of inscriptions were recently found reporting the tribal name of the Baridustae, which were produced after they moved to the new town in Dacia from their ancient tribal areas in Dalmatia. A k(astellum) Baridust(arum) is also attested in Alburnus Maior; its inhabitants formed a collegium. The existence of collegia of the Baridustae and of the Sardiatae certainly suggests a location of those communities within or near the mining district.

References

Bibliography 

Illyrian tribes
Ancient tribes in Bosnia and Herzegovina
Ancient tribes in Croatia
Ancient tribes in Dacia
Illyrian Bosnia and Herzegovina
Illyrian Croatia